Northern Mystics are a New Zealand netball team based in Auckland. Between 2008 and 2016, they played in the ANZ Championship. Since 2017 they have represented Netball Northern in the ANZ Premiership. Netball Northern is the governing body that represents the Auckland and Northland Regions. In 2021, Mystics won their first premiership.

History

Formation 
Northern Mystics were formed in 2007. The new team was effectively a merger of the two former National Bank Cup teams, Northern Force and Auckland Diamonds. Mystics subsequently became founder members of the ANZ Championship. Yvonne Willering became Mystics first head coach and Temepara George became Mystics first player.

ANZ Championship
Between 2008 and 2016, Mystics played in the ANZ Championship. On 6 April 2008, Mystics made their ANZ Championship debut in a match against Canterbury Tactix at The Trusts Arena, losing 44–48.

In 2011, with a team coached by Debbie Fuller and captained by Temepara George, Mystics reached their first grand final. They finished the regular season fourth behind Queensland Firebirds, Waikato Bay of Plenty Magic and New South Wales Swifts. During the regular season, Mystics claimed their first win in Australia, with a 56–54 win over West Coast Fever in Round 9. Mystics defeated Swifts in the minor semi-final and Magic in the preliminary final before losing to Firebirds in the grand final. Mystics finished the season second overall.

In 2012, Mystics finished second on the table after the regular season. However, they subsequently lost the major semi-final to Melbourne Vixens and the preliminary final to Magic and finished in third overall. On 20 May 2012, during a Round 8 match against Vixens, Mystics introduced the Harrison Hoist. Anna Harrison made several vital blocks while being hoisted rugby union lineout-style by her defensive partners. Harrison was lifted first by Kayla Cullen and then twice in the final quarter by Jessica Moulds. Mystics won the match 49–45. Cullen and Moulds adopted the role of a lineout lifter to hoist Harrison and the move had the desired result in the final quarter when Vixens goal shooter Karyn Howarth's goal-bound shots were twice batted away.

In 2015, Mystics went through the regular season unbeaten against their fellow New Zealand teams and topped the New Zealand Conference. However they subsequently lost the Conference final to Magic
and a semi-final to Firebirds.

Regular season statistics

ANZ Premiership 
Since 2017, Mystics have played in the ANZ Premiership. In 2021, with a team coached by Helene Wilson and captained by Sulu Fitzpatrick and featuring Ama Agbeze, Bailey Mes and Grace Nweke, Mystics won their first ever premiership. After finishing the regular season as minor premiers, they defeated Mainland Tactix 61–59 in the grand final.

Regular season statistics

Grand finals
ANZ Championship

Netball New Zealand Super Club

ANZ Premiership

Home venues
Mystics main home venue is The Trusts Arena.

Notable players

2023 squad

Internationals

 Charlotte Kight
 Jessica Moulds
 Rachel Rasmussen
 Hayley Saunders

 Julie Corletto
 Megan Dehn

 Ama Agbeze
 Jade Clarke
 Pamela Cookey
 Sasha Corbin
 Serena Guthrie

 Vilimaina Davu

 Althea Byfield

 Rachel Rasmussen
 Sheryl Scanlan
 Saviour Tui
 Cathrine Tuivaiti

 Leana de Bruin

Captains

Award winners

ANZ Championship awards
ANZ Championship MVP

Notes
  Temepara George shared the award with Laura Langman (Waikato Bay of Plenty Magic).

ANZ Championship Best New Talent

New Zealand Netball Awards
New Zealand ANZ Championship Player of the Year

Dame Lois Muir Supreme Award

Coaches

Head coaches

Assistant coaches

Specialist coaches

Main sponsors

Reserve team
Since 2016, Netball Northern have entered a team in the National Netball League. In 2017 they became known as Northern Marvels. They are effectively the reserve team of Northern Mystics. Helene Wilson was their inaugural head coach. Former Marvels players include Elisapeta Toeava and Grace Nweke. In 2021 Northern Marvels were NNL premiers after they defeated Northern Comets 64–56 in the grand final.

Honours

ANZ Premiership
Winners: 2021
Minor premiers: 2021
ANZ Championship
Runners Up: 2011
ANZ Championship – New Zealand Conference
Minor premiers: 2015
Netball New Zealand Super Club
Runners Up: 2017, 2019

References

External links
 Official website
  Northern Mystics on Facebook
  Northern Mystics on Twitter

 
ANZ Premiership teams
ANZ Championship teams
Netball teams in New Zealand
Sports clubs established in 2007
2007 establishments in New Zealand
Netball teams in Auckland